The ROH World Championship is a professional wrestling world championship created and promoted by Ring of Honor (ROH). It is considered the most prestigious title in the promotion. The current champion is Claudio Castagnoli, who is in his second reign. The title is currently defended on All Elite Wrestling's television programs (AEW being co-owned by ROH owner Tony Khan), as well as ROH pay-per-view events.

History
Low Ki defeated Spanky, Christopher Daniels, and Doug Williams in a 60-minute Iron Man match to become the inaugural ROH Champion at Crowning a Champion on July 27, 2002 after holding its first tournament to crown the inaugural champion on June 22, 2002.

Samoa Joe had the longest title reign to date when he held the belt for 21 months and four days. During his reign, ROH held a cross-promotional show with Frontier Wrestling Alliance in the United Kingdom on May 17, 2003, called Frontiers of Honor. At that show, Joe turned the title into the ROH World Championship when he defended it against The Zebra Kid. Since then the title has been defended in Germany, Canada, Switzerland, Austria, Mexico, Japan, Ireland, Italy, and Spain.

On August 12, 2006, the ROH Pure Championship was unified with the ROH World Championship after the ROH Pure Champion Nigel McGuinness lost to the ROH World Champion Bryan Danielson in Liverpool, England in a title unification match. The match was contested under pure wrestling rules, with the stipulation that both championships could be lost by disqualification or count out.

In 2010, the title belt, along with the ROH World Tag Team Championship belts, was redesigned. The new belt has an eagle with its wings spread over a picture of the world with an ROH logo on the top. This design also includes various flags on different countries. 

In December 2012, a new design was introduced at the Final Battle iPPV.

On July 3, 2013, the ROH World Championship has declared vacant for the first time since its inception, when ROH Match Maker Nigel McGuinness stripped then-champion Jay Briscoe of the title after he was sidelined with a storyline injury and would be unable to compete for the foreseeable future.

In December 2017, ROH unveiled another new design for the title belt, which debuted at Final Battle.

In late 2021, ROH announced it would go on hiatus following Final Battle. Then-ROH World Champion Bandido was supposed to wrestle Jonathan Gresham in a championship match at Final Battle until December 9 when it was announced that Bandido had tested positive for COVID-19, thus ending his participation in the scheduled match. Jay Lethal took Bandido’s place against Gresham at Final Battle where Gresham defeated Lethal and won the vacated ROH World Championship, now represented by the original title belt. However, during ROH’s hiatus after Final Battle, Gresham and Bandido would appear in different promotions defending their respective championships; Gresham with the original belt and Bandido with the most recently designed belt. The championship was defended on cards promoted by other companies such as longtime ROH national rival Impact Wrestling, Game Changer Wrestling (GCW), the UK-based Progress Wrestling, and All Elite Wrestling (AEW). Both men even defended their respective titles with Gresham's new promotion, TERMINUS. 

On January 20, 2022, it was announced that Bandido and Gresham would face each other in a championship unification match at Supercard of Honor XV, the first ROH event after the hiatus. At the event, Gresham defeated Bandido to unify the ROH World Championship. Afterwards, Gresham continued to carry the original belt while the belt carried by Bandido was shelved.

Inaugural championship tournament (2002)
On June 22, 2002, ROH held the first part of a tournament to crown the inaugural ROH Champion. Sixteen wrestlers were divided into four blocks, with the winner of each block competing in a Four-Way Iron Man match on July 27, 2002 to determine the first champion.

Final
Low Ki won the Four-Way 60-minute Iron Man match to become the inaugural champion.

Due to having multiple competitors, the rules for the Iron Man match were altered to a point system where a wrestler scoring a pinfall or submission was awarded two points, while the wrestler being pinned or submitted lost one point.

Belt designs
Currently the Championship belt has three plates on a black leather strap.

Reigns

Overall, there have been 37 ROH World Championship reigns and 30 total champions. The title has been vacated twice. The inaugural champion was Low Ki, who defeated Christopher Daniels, Spanky, and Doug Williams in a Four Way 60-minute Iron Man match at the Crowning A Champion event on July 27, 2002, to become champion.

Adam Cole holds the record for most reigns, with three. Jay Lethal has the most defenses, with 41; Kyle O'Reilly has the fewest, with 0. At 645 days, Samoa Joe has the longest reign in the title's history; Kyle O'Reilly's reign is the shortest at 33 days.

Claudio Castagnoli is the current champion in his second reign. He defeated Chris Jericho on December 10, 2022 at Final Battle in Arlington, Texas.

References

External links
ROH World Title History at Cagematch.net

Ring of Honor championships
World heavyweight wrestling championships
World professional wrestling championships